KSLU (90.9 FM) is a radio station broadcasting an adult album alternative (AAA) format. Licensed to Hammond, Louisiana, United States, the station serves the Lake Pontchartrain area.  The station is currently owned by Southeastern Louisiana University and features programming from Public Radio International.

References

External links
Official Website

Hammond, Louisiana
Radio stations in Louisiana
College radio stations in Louisiana
NPR member stations